Bitok may refer to:

People with the surname
Ezequiel Bitok (born 1966), Kenyan marathon runner
Paul Bitok (born 1970), Kenyan long-distance track runner and two-time Olympic medallist
Sostenes Bitok (born 1957), Kenyan long-distance track runner and 1984 Olympian

Other uses
Bitok, a variant of the birau (boat), a small dugout canoe of the Sama-Bajau people of the Philippines

Kenyan names